Professor Armando Menezes (1902–1983) was an Indian civil servant, writer, academic and poet who wrote in English.

Biography
He was born on 11 May 1902 in, São Matias, Divar, Goa. After a Portuguese education in Goa, he completed his higher studies at the Bombay University. At the M.A. Examination of the university he obtained the coveted Chancellor's gold medal in Latin. He taught at St Xavier's College Bombay, his own alma mater, where he became head of the department of English. Later he taught English at Karnataka College Dharwad, where he rose to become Principal. He became the first professor and chairman of the department of English in Karnatak University and some of the early.professors were his.doctoral students. Prof Menezes successfully translated Vachana Literature from Kannada into English with the assistance of S S Malawad, Prof Yeravintelimath and Prof Sarojini Shintri who was his doctoral student. This translation work is his substantial contribution to the native literature.

He was appointed Undersecretary of Education by the Government of the Bombay State and retired from his long career as an educator after this posting. 
 
Dr Patil Puttappa in one of his Kannada articles on memorable teachers has specified that Dr Nanabhoy Palkhivala, the famous Indian lawyer and constitutional expert, was his student. He always mentioned that he had the highest regards for the oratorical and teaching skills of Prof Armando Menezes.

He died in 1983 in Bombay.

References

Indian civil servants
People from North Goa district
1902 births
1983 deaths
20th-century Indian poets
Indian male poets
Poets from Goa
20th-century Indian male writers